David Egerton Withers (15 February 1911 – 23 June 1994) was an  Australian rules footballer who played with Hawthorn in the Victorian Football League (VFL).

Notes

External links 

1911 births
1994 deaths
Australian rules footballers from Victoria (Australia)
Hawthorn Football Club players